Mycena olida, commonly known as the rancid bonnet, is a species of mushroom in the family Mycenaceae. It was first described in 1887 by Italian mycologist Giacomo Bresadola.

Description

References

olida
Fungi described in 1887
Fungi of Europe
Taxa named by Giacomo Bresadola